In military terms, 119th Division or 119th Infantry Division may refer to:

 119th Division (People's Republic of China)
 119th Infantry Division (German Empire)
 119th Division (Imperial Japanese Army)

sl:Seznam divizij po zaporednih številkah (100. - 149.)#119. divizija